The 2021–22 Butler Bulldogs women's basketball team represents Butler University in the 2021–22 NCAA Division I women's basketball season. The Bulldogs, led by eighth year head coach Kurt Godlevske, play their home games at Hinkle Fieldhouse and are members of the Big East Conference.

Roster

Schedule

|-
!colspan=12 style=""| Exhibition 

|-
!colspan=12 style=""| Regular season

|-
!colspan=12 style=""| Big East Tournament

See also
2021–22 Butler Bulldogs men's basketball team

References

Butler
Butler Bulldogs women's basketball seasons
Butler
Butler